Magh may refer to:

Rakhine or Marma, an ethnic group in Myanmar and Bangladesh
 Maagha, a month in Hindu calendar
 Magh (Bengali calendar), the 10th month in the Bengali calendar. This is the last month of the winter season
 Magh (Nepali calendar), the tenth month in Bikram Sambat or B.S., the official and Hindu religious calendar of Nepal. This month approximately coincides with January 15 to February 12 of the Gregorian (western) calendar and is 29 days long
 Magh (Sikh calendar), the eleventh month of the Nanakshahi calendar, which governs the activities within Sikhism. This month coincides with January and February in the Gregorian and Julian calendars and is 30 days long
 Magha (poet), author of Shishupala Vadha
 Magh, Afghanistan, a village in Afghanistan